The 1957 Leicester South East by-election was held on 28 November 1957.  It was held due to the resignation of the incumbent Conservative MP, Charles Waterhouse.  The by-election was won by the Conservative candidate John Peel whose only opponent was the future Speaker, Betty Boothroyd standing for the first time for Labour.

References

By-elections to the Parliament of the United Kingdom in Leicestershire constituencies
Leicester South East by-election
Leicester South East by-election
Leicester South East by-election
20th century in Leicester